Campbell's Highlanders may refer to one of two Highland regiments in the British Army, both active 1760–1763:

100th Regiment of Foot (1760)
88th Regiment of Foot (Highland Volunteers)